The Kee Tai Zhongxiao is a , 37-storey mixed-used skyscraper located in Zhongzheng District, Taipei, Taiwan. The building started construction in 2012 and was completed in 2019. As of January 2021, the building is the second tallest building in Zhongzheng District, after Shin Kong Life Tower.

Location
The building is located in Zhongzheng District, which is the traditional city center of Taipei, home to most of the national government buildings of Taiwan, including the Presidential Office, the Executive Yuan, the Control Yuan, the Legislative Yuan, the Judicial Yuan and various government ministries. The building is located in close proximity to Taipei Main Station.

See also 
 List of tallest buildings in Taiwan
 List of tallest buildings in Taipei

References

2019 establishments in Taiwan
Skyscraper office buildings in Taipei
Office buildings completed in 2019
Skyscraper hotels in Taipei